František Mrázek (born May 16, 1979) is a Czech professional ice hockey left winger currently playing for the Landshut Cannibals in the German 2nd Bundesliga. He played in the Czech Extraliga for HC České Budějovice, HC Lipetsk, HC Pardubice, HC Plzeň, HC Kladno and HC Slovan Ústečtí Lvi.  He has also played in the Finnish SM-liiga for HIFK and the American Hockey League for the St. John's Maple Leafs.  He was drafted 111th overall in the 1997 NHL Entry Draft by the Toronto Maple Leafs.

External links

1979 births
Living people
Czech ice hockey left wingers
EHF Passau Black Hawks players
EV Landshut players
Heilbronner Falken players
KLH Vajgar Jindřichův Hradec players
Motor České Budějovice players
Rytíři Kladno players
HC Dynamo Pardubice players
HC Stadion Litoměřice players
HC Plzeň players
HC Slovan Ústečtí Lvi players
HIFK (ice hockey) players
Red Deer Rebels players
St. John's Maple Leafs players
Toronto Maple Leafs draft picks
Sportspeople from České Budějovice
Czech expatriate ice hockey players in Canada
Czech expatriate ice hockey players in Finland
Czech expatriate ice hockey players in Germany